Serine/threonine-protein kinase A-Raf or simply A-Raf is an enzyme that in humans is encoded by the ARAF gene. A-Raf is a member of the Raf kinase family of serine/threonine-specific protein kinases.

Compared to the other members of this family (Raf-1 and B-Raf), very little is known about A-Raf.  It seems to share many of the properties of the other isoforms, but its biological functions are not as thoroughly researched.  All three Raf proteins are involved in the MAPK signaling pathway.

There are several ways A-Raf is different from the other Raf kinases.  A-Raf is the only steroid hormone-regulated Raf isoform. In addition, the A-Raf protein has amino acid substitutions in a negatively charged region upstream of the kinase domain (N-region).  This could be responsible for its low basal activity.

Like Raf-1 and B-Raf, A-Raf activates MEK proteins which causes the activation of ERK and ultimately leads to cell cycle progression and cell proliferation.  All three Raf proteins are located in the cytosol in their inactive state when bound to 14-3-3.  In the presence of active Ras, they translocate to the plasma membrane. Among the Ras kinase family, A-Raf has the lowest kinase activity towards MEK proteins in the Raf kinase family. Thus, it is possible that A-Raf has other functions outside the MAPK pathway or that it helps the other Raf kinases activate the MAPK pathway. In addition to phosphorylating MEK, A-Raf also inhibits MST2, a tumor suppressor and proapoptotic kinase not found in the MAPK pathway. By inhibiting MST2, A-Raf can prevent apoptosis from occurring. However, this inhibition is only possible when the splice factor heterogenous nuclear ribonucleoprotein H (hnRNP H) maintains the expression of a full-length A-Raf protein. Tumorous cells often overexpress hnRNP H. When hnRNP H is downregulated, the A-RAF gene is alternatively spliced. This prevents the expression of full-length A-Raf protein. Thus, overexpression of hnRNP H in tumor cells leads to full-length expression of A-Raf which then inhibits apoptosis, allowing cancerous cells that should be destroyed to stay alive.

A-Raf also binds to pyruvate kinase M2 (PKM2), again outside the MAPK pathway.  PKM2 is an isozyme of pyruvate kinase that is responsible for the Warburg effect in cancer cells. A-Raf upregulates the activity of PKM2 by promoting a conformational change in PKM2.  This causes PKM2 to transition from its low-activity dimeric form to a highly active tetrameric form.  In cancer cells, the ratio between dimeric and tetrameric forms of PKM2 determines what happens to glucose carbons.  If PKM2 is in the dimeric form, glucose is channeled into synthetic processes such as nucleic acid, amino acid, or phospholipid synthesis.  If A-Raf is present, PKM2 is more likely to be in the tetrameric form.  This causes more glucose carbons to be converted to pyruvate and lactate, producing energy for the cell.  Thus, A-Raf can be linked to energy metabolism regulation and cell transformation, both of which are very important in tumorigenesis.

In addition, researchers have proposed a model of how A-Raf is linked to endocytosis.  Upstream of A-Raf, receptor tyrosine kinases (RTKs) are activated, leading to RAS-mediated activation of Raf kinases, including A-Raf.  Once activated, A-Raf binds to membranes rich in Phosphatidylinositol 4,5-bisphosphate (PtdIns (4,5)P2 and signals endosomes.  This leads to activation of ARF6, a central regulator of endocytic trafficking.

Interactions 

ARAF has been shown to interact with:

 EFEMP1,
 MAP2K2, 
 PRPF6,
 RRAS, 
 TIMM44, and
 TH1L.

References

Further reading

External links
 
 PDBe-KB provides an overview of all the structure information available in the PDB for Human Serine/threonine-protein kinase A-Raf

EC 2.7.11